Club Atlético Independiente (more often referred as Independiente de Neuquén) is an Argentine football club based in the city of Neuquén. The squad currently plays in Zone A of the regionalised 3rd level of Argentine football Torneo Federal A.

El Albirrojo is the only club from the Neuquén Province which plays in the Argentine third division league.

External links

Fan site 

 
Association football clubs established in 1921
1921 establishments in Argentina